Gião is a civil parish in the municipality of Vila do Conde, Portugal. The population in 2011 was 1,756, in an area of 5.66 km².

References

Freguesias of Vila do Conde